Jason Dill (born November 21, 1976) is an American professional skateboarder, photographer, and co-founder of Fucking Awesome—an American skate company.

Early life 
Dill was born in Huntington Beach, California, United States (U.S.). When he was 8, he met future professional skater Ed Templeton who Dill described as having "changed his life."

Professional skateboarding 
Dill received his first sponsorship when he was 12 before being recruited by Natas Kaupas to ride for a division of World Industries. In 1998, he joined Alien Workshop where he spent 15 years on the pro team. He held the final spot on the influential Photosynthesis video and also appeared in the later Mind Field video.

Jason Dill left Alien Workshop in 2013.

In 2014, Dill founded the skateboard company Fucking Awesome, along side fellow professional skater Anthony Van Engelen.

Dill has been featured in Electronic Arts (EA) Skate video game series.

Photography 
In 2022, Dill released the photo book Prince Street: Photos from Africa, People Remembered, Places Forgotten containing a selection of 35mm photographs spanning over 20 years from his archive.

References 

1976 births
Living people
American skateboarders